Roger Baird (born 12 April 1960 in Kelso, Scotland) is a former Scotland international rugby union player.

Rugby Union career

Amateur career

Baird attended St. Mary's School, Melrose and Merchiston Castle School in Edinburgh.  Both schools are noted for producing strong rugby players, and he went on to play scrum-half for the Scottish Schools team.

He played for the full Kelso sevens team while still at Merchiston, collecting a Melrose winner's medal at 17. Bill McLaren considered him an exceptional sevens player.

Provincial career

Baird also played for the South of Scotland rugby union team. One odd feature of Baird's playing career was noted by Allan Massie:

"Extraordinarily he has not scored a try for Scotland, though he already holds the record number of tries for the South."

International career

A regular fixture on the left wing for Scotland, he went on the 1983 British Lions tour to New Zealand, playing in all four Tests, and scoring six tries in 11 appearances. In one of these tries in particularly wet weather, he slammed right into the billboards around the pitch.

Baird was very successful at District and Club level, and scored a number of times for the British Lions, including a test try against New Zealand in 1983, but never scored a try while representing Scotland.

Coaching career

He is a former team manager of Scotland U21s and is assistant coach to Kelso clubmate Gary Callander at Watsonians.

Business career

Baird is a grain merchant.

Controversies

Roger was invited as a guest speaker at the Glasgow University RFC 150th anniversary event held in Glasgow on 16 November 2019 where he made sexist remarks about some of the female rugby team players and racist remarks regarding a previous encounter with a person of Japanese origin.

Roger was heckled off the stage and the GURFC has since issued an apology for inviting him to speak, reiterating that they are a club who promotes inclusivity and diversity and that the remarks do not reflect those of the university or the Rugby Society.

References

External links
Roger Baird on Sporting Heroes

1960 births
Living people
British & Irish Lions rugby union players from Scotland
Kelso RFC players
People educated at Merchiston Castle School
People educated at St. Mary's School, Melrose
Rugby union players from Kelso
Rugby union wings
Scotland 'B' international rugby union players
Scotland international rugby union players
Scottish rugby union players
South of Scotland District (rugby union) players